Sergei Lvovich Nemchinov (born 14 January 1964) is a Russian former professional ice hockey player who played in the National Hockey League (NHL) for the New York Rangers, Vancouver Canucks, New York Islanders and the New Jersey Devils for twelve seasons, bookended by ten seasons in the Soviet Championship League with PHC Krylya Sovetov and HC CSKA Moscow, and two in the Russian Superleague with Lokomotiv Yaroslavl. Nemchinov works in the Admiral Vladivostok.

Playing career
Nemchinov was one of the last picks of the 1990 NHL Entry Draft when he was selected in the 12th round, 244th overall by the Rangers. He went on to play in 761 regular season games in his NHL career, scoring 152 goals and 193 assists for 345 points, picking up 251 penalty minutes. He won the Stanley Cup with the Rangers in 1994 and again with the Devils in 2000. In 1994, Nemchinov, along with Alexander Karpovtsev, Alexei Kovalev, and Sergei Zubov were the first Russians to have their names engraved on the Stanley Cup. He returned to Russia in 2002 and played there until his retirement in 2004.

Nemchinov is one of eleven players to complete the "Hudson River triple" as a member of the New York Rangers, New York Islanders and New Jersey Devils.

Coaching career
Nemchinov was the general manager of HC CSKA Moscow from 2009 to 2011. Nemchinov has also coached the Russia men's national junior ice hockey team. In 2019 he joined the South Korean men's national ice hockey team as an assistant coach.

During his visit to Ashgabat, Turkmenistan Sergei Nemchinov from August 30 to September 7 conducted intensive training with the Turkmenistan men's national ice hockey team. Then he entered the coaching staff of the national team of Turkmenistan and has already drawn up a plan for preparing Turkmen hockey players for the 2020 IIHF World Championship Division III.

In March 2020, he was appointed to the post of sports director of Admiral Vladivostok.

Awards and achievements
 1993-94 – Stanley Cup champion – New York Rangers
 1999-00 – Stanley Cup champion – New Jersey Devils
 In the 2009 book 100 Ranger Greats, was ranked No. 46 all-time of the 901 New York Rangers who had played during the team's first 82 seasons

Career statistics

Regular season and playoffs

International

Transactions 
 Traded by the New York Rangers with Brian Noonan to the Vancouver Canucks for Esa Tikkanen and Russ Courtnall. March 8, 1997.
 Signed as a free agent with the New York Islanders. July 10, 1997.
 Traded by the New York Islanders to the New Jersey Devils for New Jersey's 4th round choice (Daniel Johansson) in the 1999 NHL Entry Draft. March 22, 1999.

References

External links 

Picture of Sergei Nemchinov's name engraved on the Stanley Cup for 2000

1964 births
HC CSKA Moscow players
Ice hockey players at the 1998 Winter Olympics
Krylya Sovetov Moscow players
Living people
Lokomotiv Yaroslavl players
Medalists at the 1998 Winter Olympics
New York Islanders players
New York Rangers draft picks
New York Rangers players
New Jersey Devils players
Olympic ice hockey players of Russia
Olympic medalists in ice hockey
Olympic silver medalists for Russia
Russian ice hockey centres
Russian ice hockey coaches
South Korea men's national ice hockey team coaches
Soviet ice hockey centres
Ice hockey people from Moscow
Stanley Cup champions
Turkmenistan men's national ice hockey team coaches
Vancouver Canucks players